"Vid din sida" is a song written by Ingvar Hellberg. and recorded by Sven-Ingvars, releasing it as a single around November 1966.

The song charted at Svensktoppen for 15 weeks between 5 November 1966-1967.

Charts

Weekly charts

References 

1966 songs
1966 singles
Songs written by Ingvar Hellberg
Sven-Ingvars songs
Swedish-language songs